Yuk Keep Smile (abbreviated as YKS) was an Indonesian variety show that aired on Trans TV. The show premiered on August 31, 2013 as the successor to  Yuk Kita Sahur, which previously aired as the "suhur" show of Ramadan. The show hosted and starred musical guests, usually with notable dance routines. Cinta Laura was a notable talent that starred on the show, however left to finish her education abroad.
The show last aired on June 27, 2014, after a controversy with the Indonesian Broadcasting Commission (KPI) over an incident where a hypnotist compared the late comedian Benyamin Sueb to a dog.

Notable dances and songs on the programme

Dance

Song

References

External links
Yuk Keep Smile in My Trans
Yuk Keep Smile Trans TV

Indonesian variety television shows
2013 Indonesian television series debuts
2014 Indonesian television series endings
Trans TV original programming